The Last Alliance is the fifth album by the Finnish heavy metal band Battlelore, released in 2008. It was issued as a jewel case CD and a digipack with a bonus DVD featuring footage of a live show at Metal Female Voices Fest in Wieze, Belgium in 2007.

It peaked at position 26 in The Official Finnish Charts.

Track listing
All music and lyrics by Battlelore.

Bonus DVD
"Ghân of the Woods"
"Ocean's Elysium"
"Into the New World"
"Buccaneers Inn"
"We Are the Legions"
"House of Heroes"
"Beneath the Waves"
"Sons of Riddermark"

Credits
Band members
Kaisa Jouhki - vocals
Tomi Mykkänen - vocals
Jussi Rautio - guitar
Jyri Vahvanen - guitar
Timo Honkanen - bass
Henri Vahvanen - drums
Maria Honkanen - keyboards, flute

Production
Janne Saksa - producer, engineer
Dan Swanö - mixing, mastering

Lyrical references
 "Third Immortal" deals with the wizard Radagast and his part in the defeat of Saruman.
 "Exile the Daystar" describes the effects of the Sun on the creatures of the dark.
 "The Great Gathering" is about the last alliance against Sauron at the end of the Second Age.
 "Guardians" makes reference to the eagles of Middle-Earth.
 "Voice of the Fallen" tells the story of the Mouth of Sauron.
 "Daughter of the Sun" is about Éowyn.
 "Green Dragon" is about the Green Dragon inn in Bywater.
 "Awakening" describes the creation of the Dwarves by the Vala Aulë.
 "Epic Dreams" deals with the dreams sent by the Vala Ulmo to the elven kings Turgon and Finrod Felagund.
 "Moontower" tells the story of Minas Ithil, the Tower of the Rising Moon.
 "The Star of High Hope" is about the voyages of Eärendil.

See also
The Last Alliance (band)

References

External links
Battlelore Official Homepage

Battlelore albums
Napalm Records albums
2008 albums
Albums produced by Dan Swanö